The 2016–17 Logan Cup was the 23rd edition of the Logan Cup, a first-class cricket competition in Zimbabwe. It was held  between December 2016 and May 2017. Mountaineers won the tournament, following a draw against Mashonaland Eagles in round 8 of the competition.

Originally, the tournament was scheduled to be played across twelve rounds, with each team playing each other four times. However, the start of the tournament was postponed because of logistical challenges, with the opening matches rescheduled to take place a week later than originally planned.

The opening fixture between Mid West Rhinos and Matabeleland Tuskers was interrupted at the start of day three with a strike by the players. The protest was led by domestic players, as they had not been paid in November. Matabeleland Tuskers forfeited the second innings of the match, and therefore Mid West Rhinos won the game. The second round of fixtures, originally scheduled to start on 5 January 2017, were postponed as some players still had not been paid. On 12 January 2017 Zimbabwe Cricket announced that the competition had been postponed again, with a scheduled restart in mid-February. The next day, Zimbabwe Cricket issued a press release stating that all players had now been paid and that the tournament would restart on 17 January 2017. However, both fixtures scheduled to start on this date were abandoned due to rain.

The matches originally scheduled to start on 7 February 2017 were further postponed because of Zimbabwe's domestic List A tournament, the 2016–17 Pro50 Championship. This competition was originally scheduled to start in May, but the opening fixtures were brought forward in preparation for Zimbabwe's One Day International (ODI) series against Afghanistan. The tournament restarted on 21 February 2017.

Point table
The following teams competed:

 Champions

Fixtures

Round 1

Round 2

Round 3

Round 4

Round 5

Round 6

Round 7

Round 8

Round 9

References

External links
 Series home at ESPN Cricinfo

Logan Cup
Logan Cup
Logan Cup
Logan Cup